The Arad Technical High School for Constructions and Environmental Protection (TCCEP) is located in Arad, Romania.

The school was founded in 1962 as The Medium Hidrotehnics and Meteorology School and has gone through several name changes.

The current name was adopted in 1997 following a ministerial evaluation from The Arad County School Board which granted the title of College.

References and footnotes

Educational institutions established in 1962
Schools in Arad County
High schools in Romania